Laniifera is a genus of snout moths in the subfamily Spilomelinae of the family Crambidae. The genus was erected by George Hampson in 1899 with  Pachynoa cyclades Druce, 1895 as type species.

The caterpillars of Laniifera cyclades feed on Opuntia (prickly pear cactuses) and are considered a pest of commercially grown Opuntia species.

The genus with its two species is distributed in Mexico, the southern USA (Arizona, Texas) and the Dominican Republic.

Species
Laniifera cyclades (Druce, 1895)
Laniifera rawlinsi Hayden, 2020

References

Spilomelinae
Crambidae genera
Taxa named by George Hampson